An Ardent Heart is a 1953 Soviet drama film directed by Gennadi Kazansky and starring Gennadiy Michurin, Anna Belousova and Tamara Alyoshina. It is based on the play An Ardent Heart by Aleksandr Ostrovskiy. It was made by Lenfilm Studio.

Synopsis
The famous merchant Kuroslepov wastes his life binge drinking. The home is run by his wife Matrona, an overbearing and immoral woman who spends her husband's money, has an affair with the bailiff and strongly oppresses Parasha, Kuroslepov's daughter from his first marriage. The plot develops around the loss of a large sum of money. Parasha's groom Vasya gets accused of stealing and is threatened with being sent to serve in the army. The unfortunate young woman desperately prays for her man. The cowardly and prudent Vasya agrees to become a clown of the merchant Khlynov, who buys him off from conscription. Realizing the nullity of her beloved, Parasha finds happiness with a clerk Gavrila who is infatuated with her.

Cast
 Gennadiy Michurin as Kuroslepov Pavlin Pavlinovich
 Anna Belousova as Kuroslepov's wife
 Tamara Alyoshina as Parasha
 Aleksandr Borisov as Gavrilo
 Konstantin Kalinis as Vasya Shustryi
 Konstantin Skorobogatov as Gradoboev Serapion Mordarievich
 Konstantin Adashevsky as Khlynov Taras Tarasovich
 G. Osipenko as Silan

References

Bibliography 
 Goble, Alan. The Complete Index to Literary Sources in Film. Walter de Gruyter, 1999.

External links 
 

1953 drama films
1953 films
Soviet drama films
1950s Russian-language films
Films based on works by Alexander Ostrovsky
Films directed by Gennadi Kazansky
Soviet black-and-white films